The 12441 / 12442 Bilaspur Rajdhani Express is a Rajdhani Express train belonging to Indian Railways – Northern Railway zone that runs between  and  in India.

It operates as train number 12441 from Bilaspur Junction to New Delhi and as train number 12442 in the reverse direction, serving the states of Chhattisgarh, Maharashtra, Madhya Pradesh, Uttar Pradesh & Delhi.Currently this is the only Rajdhani in the entire Indian Railway network to have Loco/Rake Reversal.The Loco/Rake reversal for both the trains occur at Nagpur Jn(NGP)

Coaches

The 12441 / 42 Bilaspur–New Delhi Rajdhani Express presently has 1 AC 1st Class, 6 AC 2 tier, 10 AC 3 tier,  Pantry car & 2 End on Generator coaches.

As is customary with most train services in India, coach composition may be amended at the discretion of Indian Railways depending on demand.

It was the last Rajdhani class train to get LHB coach (in 2016). Now all Rajdhani services are LHBfied.

Service

The 12441 Bilaspur–New Delhi Rajdhani Express covers the distance of 1501 kilometres in 20 hours 45 mins (72.34 km/hr) & in 20 hours 15 mins as 12442 New Delhi–Bilaspur Rajdhani Express (74.12 km/hr).

As the average speed of the train is above , as per Indian Railways rules, its fare includes a Superfast surcharge.

Route

The 12441 / 12442 Bilaspur–New Delhi Rajdhani Express runs from Bilaspur Junction via Raipur Junction, Nagpur New Delhi.

In the year 2008–11, This train was extended up till Howrah Junction for providing – connection. That time the train used to depart Howrah Junction at 21.35 P.M.,  at 01.05 A.M.,  at 08.05 A.M., Nagpur at 14.35 P.M. & reached New Delhi on 3rd day morning at 05.20 A.M. On return the train used to depart  at 20.35 P.M., Nagpur at 10.49 A.M., Bilaspur Junction at 17.34 P.M. Tatanagar at 00.40 A.M. & reached Howrah Junction at 04.20 A.M. From 2012, the extended service was withdrawn.

Traction

As the route is fully electrified, it is hauled from end to end by a powerful Ajni-based WAP-7 (HOG)-equipped locomotive.

Timings

12441 Bilaspur–New Delhi Rajdhani Express leaves Bilaspur Junction every Monday & Thursday at 14:00 hrs IST and reaches New Delhi at 10:45 hrs IST the next day.
12442 New Delhi–Bilaspur Rajdhani Express leaves New Delhi every Tuesday & Saturday at 15:45 hrs IST and reaches Bilaspur Junction at 12:00 hrs IST the next day.

References

External links

Transport in Bilaspur, Chhattisgarh
Transport in Delhi
Rajdhani Express trains
Rail transport in Chhattisgarh
Rail transport in Maharashtra
Rail transport in Madhya Pradesh
Rail transport in Uttar Pradesh
Rail transport in Delhi
Railway services introduced in 2001